Sweet flag is the common name for the flowering plant Acorus calamus.

Sweet flag may also refer to

 Japanese sweet flag or grassy-leaved sweet flag (Acorus gramineus)
 American sweet flag (Acorus americanus)

See also
 Spreadwing